Tabanini is a tribe of horse and deer flies in the family Tabanidae. There are at least 220 described species in Tabanini.

Genera
Agkistrocerus Philip, 1941
Ancala Enderlein, 1922
Atylotus Osten Sacken, 1876
Dasyrhamphis Enderlein, 1922
Hamatabanus Philip, 1941
Hybomitra Enderlein, 1922
Poeciloderas Lutz, 1921
Tabanus Linnaeus, 1758
Therioplectes Zeller, 1842
Whitneyomyia Bequaert, 1933

References

Further reading

External links

 Diptera.info
 NCBI Taxonomy Browser, Tabanini

Tabanidae
Brachycera tribes
Taxa named by Günther Enderlein